Lay It on Me may refer to:
"Lay It on Me" (Kelly Rowland song), 2011
"Lay It on Me" (Ina Wroldsen and Broiler song), 2016
"Lay It on Me" (Vance Joy song), 2017
"Lay It on Me" (EP), 2020 EP by Nick Lowe
"Lay It on Me", a 1970 song by The Bee Gees
"Lay It on Me", a 2014 song by Dylan Scott
"Lay It on Me", a 2017 song by Kasbo and Keiynan Lonsdale

See also
Lay It All on Me